The 2016–17 season was the twelfth season of the current professional domestic soccer competition in Australia.

Domestic competitions

A-League

Finals series

W-League

Finals series

National Premier Leagues

The 2016 National Premier Leagues Finals series began on 17 September 2016.

National Youth League

Grand final

Domestic cups

FFA Cup

National teams

Men's senior

Friendlies
The following is a list of friendlies played by the men's senior national team in 2016–17.

FIFA World Cup qualification

FIFA Confederations Cup

Men's under 23

Friendlies
The following is a list of friendlies played by the men's under 23 national team in 2016–17.

Men's under-20

Friendlies
The following is a list of friendlies played by the men's under 20 national team in 2016–17.

AFF U-19 Youth Championship

AFC U-19 Championship

Men's under-17

Friendlies
The following is a list of friendlies played by the men's under 17 national team in 2016–17.

AFF U-16 Youth Championship

AFC U-16 Championship

Women's senior

Friendlies
The following is a list of friendlies played by the women's senior national team in 2016–17.

Summer Olympics

Algarve Cup

Women's under-20

AFF Women's Championship

AFC U-19 Women's Championship qualification

Women's under-17

AFC U-17 Women's Championship qualification

Retirements
 4 July 2016: Chris Naumoff, 21, former Sydney FC midfielder.
 22 July 2016: Nick Carle, 34, former Australia, Sydney Olympic, Marconi Stallions, Newcastle Jets and Sydney FC midfielder.
 27 July 2016: Brianna Davey, 21, former Australia, Melbourne Victory and Melbourne City goalkeeper.

References

External links
 Football Federation Australia official website

 
 
Seasons in Australian soccer
2016–17 in Australian women's soccer